Euphorbia angrae is a species of plant in the family Euphorbiaceae. It is endemic to Namibia.  Its natural habitat is cold desert.

As most other succulent members of the genus Euphorbia, its trade is regulated under Appendix II of CITES.

References

Flora of Namibia
angrae
angrae
Least concern plants
Taxonomy articles created by Polbot
Taxa named by N. E. Brown